Leguignon the Healer (French: Leguignon guérisseur) is a 1954 French comedy film directed by Maurice Labro and starring Yves Deniaud, Jane Marken and Nicole Besnard. The film's sets were designed by the art director Jean Douarinou. It was made as a sequel to the 1952 film Monsieur Leguignon, Signalman.

Synopsis
Leguignon suddenly discovers that he has a magical gift for healing people. These powers cause deep resentment amongst the vested interests in his town such as the physician and some inhabitants hoping their wealthy relative will die. They manage to have him incarcerated in prison for two weeks, but when he is released he still faces pressure. To complicate matters his daughter is in love with the doctor's son.

Cast
 Yves Deniaud as 	Diogène Leguignon
 Jane Marken as Mme Leguignon
 Nicole Besnard as 	Arlette Leguignon
 Michel Roux as 	Jean
 André Versini as 	Thierry Coq
 André Brunot as 	Dr. Martinet
 Louis Blanche as 	M. Coq
 Marcel Charvey as L'avocat général
 Max Dalban as 	L'épicier
 Paul Demange as 	Le pharmacien
 Max Elloy as 	Le facteur
 Paul Faivre as 	Le gardien chef
 Lucien Guervil as 	Paul Coq
 Janine Guiraud as La nièce
 Any Lorène as Louise
 Raoul Marco as Le vétérinaire
 Maryse Martin as La cliente
 Paul Mirvil as L'avocat
 André Philip as 	L'inspecteur du fisc
 Alexandre Rignault as 	Le chef du personnel
 Robert Burnier as 	Le président du tribunal
 Colette Mars as 	Rita
 André Gabriello as Le patron du bistrot

References

Bibliography
Dyer, Richard & Vincendeau, Ginette. Popular European Cinema. Routledge, 2013.
 Rège, Philippe. Encyclopedia of French Film Directors, Volume 1. Scarecrow Press, 2009.

External links 
 

1954 films
1954 comedy films
French comedy films
1950s French-language films
Films directed by Maurice Labro
French sequel films
French black-and-white films
1950s French films